Events from the year 1775 in Ireland.

Incumbent
Monarch: George III

Events
Henry Flood accepts a seat on the Privy Council of Ireland and becomes vice-treasurer.
Henry Grattan enters the Parliament of Ireland and becomes leader of the "patriot party".
Approximate date – Dark Hedges planted.

Arts and literature
17 January – Richard Brinsley Sheridan's first play, the comedy of manners The Rivals, is premiered at the Covent Garden Theatre, London.
Robert Jephson's tragedy Braganza is first performed at the Theatre Royal, Drury Lane, London.

Births
3 March – Henry Prittie, 2nd Baron Dunalley, politician (died 1854).
25 April – William Warren Baldwin, doctor, businessman, lawyer, judge, architect and political figure in Upper Canada (died 1844).
6 August – Daniel O'Connell, politician, campaigner for Catholic Emancipation and Repeal of the Union (died 1847).
30 September – Robert Adrain, scientist and mathematician in America (died 1843).
Full date unknown
Bernard McMahon, horticulturalist in the United States (died 1816).
William Thompson, political and philosophical writer and social reformer (died 1833).

Deaths
27 April – John Rutty, Quaker physician and naturalist (born c. 1697 in England).
31 December – Richard Montgomery, soldier, major general in the Continental Army during the Revolutionary War (born 1738).
Probable date – Elizabeth Aldworth, freemason (born 1693/5).

References

 
Years of the 18th century in Ireland
Ireland
1770s in Ireland